The Battle of Mlali was fought during the East African Campaign of World War I. In mid-August 1916, the British General Jan Christiaan Smuts led three divisions from Kenya south into the Imperial German colony of Tanganyika in order to seize and disrupt their vital railway.  The German commander Paul von Lettow-Vorbeck was informed by his scouts of the British movement and sent Captain Otto to investigate. 

The Germans were forced to withdraw in the face of greater British numbers. Despite several skirmishes, the British never succeeded in drawing out the main body of the German force to face their superior numbers. However, despite this the Germans lost several important supply locations when they were captured by the British. 

The British objective was primarily to destroy German troops, which they failed to achieve. However, despite this failure the battle was considered as a victory by the British High Command, since they had Germans forced into a retreat.

Captain William Bloomfield of the 2nd South African Mounted Brigade received the Victoria Cross for rescuing a wounded corporal during the battle at great personal risk.

Sources
"Captain W.A. Bloomfield, VC" The Soldier's Burden. http://www.kaiserscross.com/188001/295022.html

References

Battles of the East African Campaign
Battles of World War I involving Germany
August 1916 events
1916 in Africa